Joseph Brennan may refer to:

Politicians 
Joseph Brennan (Irish senator) (died 1950), Irish politician
Joseph Brennan (Clann na Poblachta politician) (1889–1968), Irish TD 1948–1951
Joseph Brennan (Fianna Fáil politician) (1912–1980), Irish government minister and Ceann Comhairle
Joseph E. Brennan (born 1934), U.S. politician, former Governor of Maine
Joseph F. Brennan (born 1964), Pennsylvania politician

Others 
Joseph Brenan or Brennan (1828–1857), writer and Young Irelander
Joseph Charles Brennan (1836–1872), English recipient of the Victoria Cross
Joseph Brennan (civil servant) (1887–1976), Irish civil servant
Joseph Brennan (basketball) (1900–1989), American basketball player
Joseph Brennan (author) (born 1986), Australian author
Joseph Payne Brennan (1918–1990), American writer and poet
Joseph Vincent Brennan (born 1954), Auxiliary Bishop, Roman Catholic Archdiocese of Los Angeles since 2015
Joe Brennan (hurler) (born 1990), Irish hurler
Joe Brennan (rugby league) (1908–1949), Australian rugby league footballer

See also
John Joseph Brennan (1913–1976), Irish politician